Jadwiga Damse (born 5 September 1947) is a Polish luger. She competed in the women's singles event at the 1968 Winter Olympics.

References

1947 births
Living people
Polish female lugers
Olympic lugers of Poland
Lugers at the 1968 Winter Olympics
People from Nisko